St. John the Baptist's Monastery ( is an Eastern Orthodox monastery in Voskopojë, Albania.

History and description
According to the donor's inscription, the church inside the Monastery was built in 1632 and painted in 1659. Today the monastery is declared a Cultural Monument of Albania. The monastery includes the church as well as two other buildings which were part of the monastery. The church has dimensions of 17m x 7.65 X 9m. The frescoes are preserved and in a good afresket and worked with components of iron and calcium. The church is characterized by decoration on a particular type of tile that is found in the area.

References

Cultural Monuments of Albania
Eastern Orthodox church buildings in Albania
Churches in Moscopole
Buildings and structures in Korçë County
Eastern Orthodox monasteries in Albania
1632 establishments in the Ottoman Empire
Buildings and structures completed in 1632